A. Devarahalli  is a village in the southern state of Karnataka, India. It is located in the Yelandur taluk of Chamarajanagar district in Karnataka.

See also
 Chamarajanagar
 Districts of Karnataka

References

External links
  A. Devarahalli as per government of India Website.

Villages in Chamarajanagar district